The Cincinnati Silverbacks was an indoor soccer club based in Cincinnati, Ohio that competed in the National Professional Soccer League.

History
They performed under the leadership of All-Star goalkeeper Carlos Pena. Other star players included Gino DiFlorio (who scored a team record 10 points in his Silverback debut against rival Cleveland Crunch), Franklin McIntosh, Shawn Medved, and Dennis Brose. Games were held at the Cincinnati Gardens for their first two seasons before moving downtown along with the Cincinnati Cyclones where they would compete at The Crown (now known as US Bank Arena) for their final year of competition.

Despite their performance and fan support, the Silverbacks were discontinued due to not generating revenue. The Detroit-based Nederlander Organization, which manages Riverbend and the Taft Theater in Cincinnati as well as the Crown, was a partner in Cincinnati Entertainment Associates Ltd., which owned the Crown, Cyclones and Silverbacks. Former President Rich Neumann said a contributing factor to the club's demise was a lack of weekend home dates. Of the 20 home games played in an average season, the Silverbacks would need at least 15 to be on a Friday or Saturday night. In their final season, 13 games were played on Friday or Saturday. Roughly 75 percent of Silverbacks ticket sales come from groups, with less than 10 percent—believed to be around 100—season ticket holders.

The team was previously known as the Dayton Dynamo, from 1987/88-1994/95.

Year-by-year

1995–96: The Inaugural Season

Roster

References

S
Soccer clubs in Ohio
Defunct indoor soccer clubs in the United States
National Professional Soccer League (1984–2001) teams
1995 establishments in Ohio
1998 disestablishments in Ohio
Association football clubs established in 1995
Association football clubs disestablished in 1998